was a district located in Fukui Prefecture, Japan.

As of 2003, the district had an estimated population of 701 and a density of 2.11 persons per km2. The total area was 332.38 km2.

Towns and villages
Prior to its dissolution, the district had only one village:

 Izumi

History

Recent mergers
 On November 7, 2005 - The village of Izumi was merged into the expanded city of Ōno. Ōno District was dissolved as a result of this merger.

Former districts of Fukui Prefecture